Following is a list of public domain works with multimedia adaptations. This lists includes works for which installments exist in multiple forms of media, such as books, comic books, films, television series, and video games. Multimedia franchises usually develop through a character or fictional world becoming popular in one medium, and then expanding to others through licensing agreements, with respect to intellectual property in the franchise's characters and settings. With respect to public domain works, however, adaptations or extensions of the original work may be done without the permission of the author.

To qualify for purposes of this list, the original media must have originated from the work of an identifiable author or set of co-authors, and must have been adapted into works in at least three forms of media, and must have two or more separate works in at least two of those forms of media (a television series or comic book series is considered a single work for purposes of this list; multiple spin-off series or remakes of a previously ended series are considered multiple works). For example, a novel that spawned one film and one television series would not qualify; a series of novels made into a television series that had a spin-off series, or was remade as a new series, and which also spawned one film, does qualify.

All of these works arise in literature, because there are far fewer works in any other media in the public domain. Although many historical figures (such as Abraham Lincoln, Julius Caesar, and Casanova) and historical events (such as the sinking of the Titanic) have been portrayed in multiple media, with fictionalized elements, these people and events are not themselves "works", and therefore do not fall within the scope of this list.

Table
Note: This list excludes myth legends and fairy tales with no known author.

See also
List of multimedia franchises
List of fictional shared universes in film and television
Expanded universe
Fictional universe
Literary adaptation
Spin-off (media)
Classics Illustrated#Issues

Notes

References

Public domain
Works based on literature
Adaptation (arts)